= Nandni =

- village
- Location within Madhya Pradesh Location within India
- Coordinates: 23.1913237°N 77.2606305°E
- Country: India
- State: Madhya Pradesh
- District: Bhopal
- Tehsil: Huzur
- Elevation: 521 m (1,709 ft)

Population (2011)
  - Total: 654
- Time zone: UTC+5:30 (IST)
- ISO 3166 code: MP-IN
- 2011 census code: 482493

Nandni is a village in the Bhopal district of Madhya Pradesh, India. It is located in the Huzur tehsil and the Phanda block.

== Demographics ==
According to the 2011 census of India, Nandni has 102 households. The effective literacy rate (i.e. the literacy rate of population excluding children aged 6 and below) is 77.96%.

Demographics (2011 Census)
	Total	Male	Female
Population	654	329	325
Children aged below 6 years	96	52	44
Scheduled caste	116	64	52
Scheduled tribe	0	0	0
Literates	435	243	192
Workers (all)	321	170	151
Main workers (total)	318	169	149
Main workers: Cultivators	269	143	126
Main workers: Agricultural labourers	44	23	21
Main workers: Household industry workers	0	0	0
Main workers: Other	5	3	2
Marginal workers (total)	3	1	2
Marginal workers: Cultivators	0	0	0
Marginal workers: Agricultural labourers	3	1	2
Marginal workers: Household industry workers	0	0	0
Marginal workers: Others	0	0	0
Non-workers	333	159	174
